Friedrich XI, Count of Hohenzollern (died 26 November 1401), nicknamed Friedrich the Elder was a German nobleman.  He was a member of the House of Hohenzollern and a ruling Count of Hohenzollern-Hechingen.

Life 
Friedrich was the younger son of Count Friedrich of Strasbourg, from his marriage to Margaret, the daughter of Count Burchard V of Hohenberg-Wildenberg.

After the death of Friedrich IX, Friedrich XI became the senior member of the House of Hohenzollern.  As such, he was the Vogt of Stetten Abbey.

He was a member of the Lion League, which joined the Swabian League of Cities in 1382.  When the latter clashed with Count Eberhard II of Württemberg, Friedrich XI managed to break off the services he had promised to Count Eberhard.

In 1388, he regained the town of Hechingen, which bishop Friedrich of Strasbourg had held.  After a town fire in 1401, he granted the town a letter of liberty.

Friedrich XI died in 1401, and was buried in the Hohenzollern crypt in Stetten Abbey.

Marriage and issue 
Before 12 January 1377, Friedrich XI married Adelheid (d. 1413), a daughter of Count Hugo of Fürstenberg-Zindelstein.  Her brother Johann was the last Count of Fürstenberg-Haslah.  Johann died childless in the Battle of Sempach of 1386, and Friedrich XI inherited Bräunlingen from him, which gave rise to a lengthy dispute with the main line of the Fürstenberg family.

From his marriage with Adelheid, Friedrich had the following children:
 Friedrich XII (d. 1443), Count of Hohenzollern, married in 1407 Anna of Sulz (d. 1438)
 Eitel Friedrich I (d. 1439), Count of Hohenzollern, married in 1432 to Ursula Razüns (d. 1477). He had issue:
 Jobst Nikolaus I, Count of Hohenzollern
 Anna, a nun
 Friedrich, a canon in Strasbourg
 Friedrich (d. 1436), Bishop of Constance as Friedrich III
 Friedrich, a monk

Ancestry

References 
 Count Rudolph Stillfried-Alcántara and Traugott Maercker: Hohenzollerische Forschungen, C. Reimarus, 1847, p. 203 ff.
 E. G. Johler: Geschichte, Land- und Ortskunde der souverainen teutschen Fürstenthümer Hohenzollern Hechingen und Sigmaringen, Stettin'sche Buchhandlung, Ulm, 1824, Online
 Gustav Schilling: Geschichte des Hauses Hohenzollern in genealogisch fortlaufenden Biographien aller seiner Regenten von den ältesten bis auf die neuesten Zeiten, nach Urkunden und andern authentischen Quellen, Fleischer, Leipzig, 1843, Online

Counts of Hohenzollern
House of Hohenzollern
14th-century births
1401 deaths

Year of birth unknown
People from Hechingen